The term physics envy is used to criticize modern writing and research of academics working in areas such as "softer sciences", liberal arts, business studies, and humanities. The term argues that writing and working practices in these disciplines have overused confusing jargon and complicated mathematics to seem more 'rigorous' and like mathematics-based subjects like physics.

Background
The success of physics in "mathematicizing" itself, particularly since Isaac Newton's Principia Mathematica, is generally considered remarkable and often disproportionate compared to other areas of inquiry. "Physics envy" refers to the envy (perceived or real) of scholars in other disciplines for the mathematical precision of fundamental concepts obtained by physicists. It is an accusation raised against disciplines (typically against social sciences and liberal arts such as literature, philosophy, economics, and psychology) when these academic areas try to express their fundamental concepts in terms of mathematics, which is seen as an unwarranted push for reductionism.

Evolutionary biologist Ernst Mayr discusses the issue of the inability to reduce biology to its mathematical basis in his book What Makes Biology Unique?. Noam Chomsky discusses the ability and desirability of reduction to its mathematical basis in his article "Mysteries of Nature: How Deeply Hidden." Chomsky contributed extensively to the development of the field of theoretical linguistics, a formal science.

Examples 
Social science has been accused of inferiority complex, which has been associated with physics envy. For instance, positivist scientists accept a mistaken image of natural science so it can be applied to the social sciences. The phenomenon also exists in business strategy research as demonstrated by historian Alfred Chandler Jr.'s strategy structure model. This framework holds that a firm must evaluate the environment in order to set up its structure that will implement strategies. Chandler also maintained that there is close connection "between mathematics, physics, and engineering graduates and the systemizing of the business strategy paradigm".

In the field of artificial intelligence (AI), physics envy arises in cases of projects that lack interaction with each other, using only one idea due to the manner by which new hypotheses are tested and discarded in the pursuit of one true intelligence.

See also
Scientism
Academese
Newtonianism
Philosophy of biology
Philosophy of physics
Philosophy of science
Reductionism
Unreasonable ineffectiveness of mathematics

Notes

References

 Collected in

External links
Overcoming ‘Physics Envy’, op-ed by two political scientists. New York Times, published March 30, 2012
Physics Envy: "quants" and financial models, essay and book review of Models Behaving Badly by Emanuel Derman. Review by Burton Malkiel, WSJ, December 14, 2011
 Andrew Lo (MIT Sloan School) and Mark Mueller (MIT Sloan School and MIT Center for Theoretical Physics), "Warning: Physics Envy May be Hazardous to Your Wealth!" published in the Journal of Investment Management, Volume 8, Number 2, Second Quarter 2010 

Philosophy of science
Sociology of scientific knowledge